Bethpage Federal Credit Union is a federally chartered company headquartered in Bethpage, Long Island, New York. As of January 2017, Bethpage FCU is the largest credit union company in New York state and 16th largest in the nation with approximately $9.2 billion in assets, 405,700 members, and 38 publicly accessible branches throughout Nassau and Suffolk counties.

Eligibility for membership is extended to anyone who lives in the United States of America.  Member deposits up to $250,000 in Bethpage FCU are insured through the National Credit Union Share Insurance Fund.

History
Grumman Hangar 2 Credit Union was opened for employees of Grumman Aircraft Engineering Corporation on October 28, 1941. Having been initially formed in Farmingdale, Grumman had moved to Bethpage by the time the credit union was separated in 1994, thus changing its name to Bethpage Federal Credit Union. In 2003, Bethpage was approved for the largest federal community charter in the U.S., allowing its rapid growth.

Community involvement
Bethpage FCU has extensive ties to the communities it serves.  For many years, Bethpage FCU has sponsored the Bethpage Air Show at Jones Beach. In 2010, Bethpage FCU signed a 10-year contract to sponsor the Suffolk County Sports Park in Central Islip, known as Bethpage Ballpark under their sponsorship (now known as Fairfield Properties Ballpark), home of the Long Island Ducks.  Bethpage FCU agreed in 2014 to sponsor the football stadium at the C.W. Post Campus of Long Island University, where they have also established a high-tech branch for the students and faculty of the school.

References

External links

 Official website

Credit unions based in New York (state)
Banks established in 1941
Companies based in Nassau County, New York
Bethpage, New York